The Fresno Monsters are a junior ice hockey team based in Fresno, California. The team is a member of the United States Premier Hockey League and plays in the Premier Division. The Monsters' home venue is Gateway Ice Center.

History
The Monsters were announced in spring 2009, filling a void for hockey in Fresno after the Fresno Falcons folded. The team began play in mid-September 2009, playing in the Tier III Jr. A Western States Hockey League (WSHL). On December 15, 2009, the Monsters announced the organization was given expansion approval into the Tier II North American Hockey League (NAHL) for the 2010–11 season and Fresno would host two levels of junior hockey for the first time. On May 23, 2013, it was revealed the Monsters' North American Hockey League franchise would move to Wenatchee, Washington, and become the second Wenatchee Wild. The Monsters would continue to field a team in the Western States Hockey League, now sanctioned under United Hockey Union (UHU) instead of USA Hockey, with the same ownership of David White and Shoot the Puck, Inc. In 2015, the UHU promoted the WSHL and Monsters to their own level of Tier II.

On March 22, 2016, after six seasons coaching the WSHL Monsters, head coach and general manager Bryce Dale stepped down from his positions with the organization. In June 2016, David White sold the Monsters to the Central Valley Community Sports Foundation, led by Jeff Blair. Former Monsters' assistant coach, Jason Rivera, was then named head coach but was replaced by former NHL enforcer, Kevin "Killer" Kaminski prior to the season. In January 2018, the team announced it would begin to occasionally play games again at the larger Selland Arena, their home while the organization also had a NAHL franchise. The following season, the Monsters moved back to Selland Arena for 21 of their 23 scheduled home games. After three seasons, coach Kaminski left to become the head coach of the La Ronge Ice Wolves in his home province of Saskatchewan. He was replaced by Trevor Karasiewicz from the Watertown Wolves in the Federal Hockey League.

In 2020, the Monsters left the WSHL and joined another independent junior hockey league, the United States Premier Hockey League (USPHL), in the Premier Division.

Season-by-season records

WSHL/USPHL team (2009–present)

North American Hockey League team (2010–2013)

References

External links
 http://www.fresnomonsters.com

Defunct North American Hockey League teams
Ice hockey teams in California
Sports in Fresno, California
Ice hockey clubs established in 2009
2009 establishments in California